Necator  may refer to:
 Necator (fungus), a genus of fungus in the family Corticiaceae
 Necator (nematode), a genus of nematodes in the family Ancylostomatidae